The Maratha-Mysore War (1682) refers to a series of battles fought between the Maratha Empire and the Kingdom of Mysore in Southern India, both of which were attempting to establish supremacy in Southern India. The Maratha forces were led by Sambhaji and the Mysore forces were led by Chikka Devaraja.

Background 
Sambhaji's grandfather, Shahaji, had conquered territories in the states of Karnataka, leading to Mohammed Adil Shah, Sultan of Bijapur granting him the title of Jagir of Bangalore. These events began the entry of the Marathas in the Southern India. Shivaji had established Maratha territories in the Southern India in his two-year-long campaign of 1676–78. The Maratha Empire and the Mysore kingdom were the main contenders to dominate the region, and the relationship between the two was generally hostile. In 1681, the Marathas attacked Srirangapatna, but were defeated, though the Maratha Sardar Harji Raje Mahadik defeated the Mysore general Kumaraiya. Both forces had tried to subdue each other resulting in a stalemate. Sambhaji also tried to form a Deccan alliance against the Mughal Emperor Aurangzeb. Chikkadevaraya allied himself with Aurangzeb and executed the Maratha generals Dadaji Kakade, Jaitaji Katkar and Santaji Nimbalkar. This enraged Sambhaji and he attacked the Kingdom of Mysore in June 1682 with his allies Qutb Shahi dynasty and the Nayakas of Hukkeri. Allied forces reached Banavar in June 1682.

Battle of Banavar 

To counter the allied army at Banavar, Chikkadevaraya left Mysore with his strong contingent of 15,000 expert archers. He wanted to attack before the allies settled in the region. Both sides prepared for the battle. And the battle began with small skirmishes.

Soon, Chikkadevaraya realised that the allied forces did not have archers. He arranged his archers in a semicircular formation and started showering arrows on the allied army. The Marathas did not expect this and the arrows started mounting casualties In the allied army. Maratha commanders tried but were unable to stop the rout. Some more reinforcements joined the Marathas during the battle, but they suffered heavy casualties in the battle. The Mysore archers took a break for dinner in the night. Sambhaji decided to retreat to avoid more casualties and he retreated towards Thanjavur.

Battle of Trichinopoly 

Sambhaji rested near Thanjavur for 20 days. He received more reinforcements from Hukkeri and Golconda. His uncle Ekoji I also joined forces with him.

Sambhaji had realized the strength of Mysore forces near their heartland. He decided to draw them away from their stronghold to flat plains near Madurai. He decided to attack and besiege the city of Tiruchirapalli.

The weakened Nayaka of Madurai, Chokkanatha Nayak lived on the fort. He was a vassal of the Kingdom of Mysore. Still, the city had strong defences and a formidable Mysore garrison in the city and on the fort.

Sambhaji wanted to negate the superiority of Mysore archers. During their rest time Sambhaji ordered all the cobblers from neighbouring villages and made leather arrow-proof jackets for his entire army. These leather jackets were coated with a layer of oil to avoid arrows from getting stuck in the jackets. Sambhaji also collected the abundantly available war elephants from the surrounding region. He ordered all the boatmen from the nearby villages to assemble with his army. 300 archers of the Maratha army were prepared to fire lit arrows during the attack.

Tiruchirapalli lied on the opposite bank of the Kaveri river. At the dawn, the Maratha forces crossed the river using the boats collected from nearby villages. The sudden attack of the Marathas surprised the Mysore defenders, they started showering arrows on the Maratha Army. The Maratha leather jackets provided effective protection and negated arrows from the Mysore bowmen. Elephants broke through the main doors in the meanwhile and fierce battle ensued on the streets of Tiruchirappalli. Marathas captured the city by the evening but the Tiruchirapalli Rock Fort  was still controlled by the Mysore army.

Meanwhile Chokkanatha Nayak died on the fort. Sambhaji with a force of 10,000 laid siege to the fort after 10 days. The Marathas again adopted similar tactics to negate Mysore archers. The Maratha archers accurately struck lit arrows on the ammunitions depot within the fort resulting in a huge explosion, and collapse of the wall. The Marathas soon entered and captured the fort. The Marathas sacked Tiruchirapalli. 

Historian Sadashiv Shivde has mentioned that, this victory was a success point of Sambhaji's military intelligence.

Aftermath 
The defeat at Trichinopoly (Tiruchirappalli) dealt a severe blow to Chikkadevaraya. Several of his allies joined Sambhaji. Sambhaji captured several fortresses in the northern provinces of Madurai. He also held all the province of Dharmapuri and other neighbouring territories. Chikkadevaraya entered negotiations with Sambhaji and brought an end to the war by paying the tribute. According to Maratha sources a treaty was signed at Srirangapatna in which he paid 1 Crore Honas as a war tribute to Sambhaji. However this was a temporary surrender and the conflicts continued in the following years. The Jesuit letter of 1682 describes the precarious position of Chikka Devaraja, 'The power of the king of Mysore begins to grow weak because, violently attacked in his own dominions by the troops of Sambhaji, he cannot sustain and reinforce the armies he had sent to those countries.'

See also 
 Battle of Banavar
 Battle of Trichinopoly

References 

Conflicts in 1682
Battles fought by Marathas under Sambhaji